Carol Springer (née Purkeypile; December 5, 1936 – August 9, 2018) was an American politician who served as the State Treasurer of Arizona from January 1999 until January 2003. A Republican, she was elected in November 1998.

During her tenure, all five of Arizona's statewide executive offices were held by women: Governor Jane Dee Hull, Secretary of State Betsey Bayless, Attorney General Janet Napolitano, Springer, and Superintendent of Public Instruction Lisa Graham Keegan.

Springer served as an Arizona State Senator for District 1 between 1990 and 1998. She ran in the 2002 gubernatorial primary election as a Republican. In 2005 she assumed the position of Yavapai County Supervisor.

References

 Bio – Carol Springer, District 1 Supervisor. Yavapai County. Accessed 2011-01-05.
 Arizona GOP Gubernatorial Primary A 7-Ring Circus?. Arizona Capital Times, September 9, 2005. Accessed 2011-01-05.

1936 births
2018 deaths
Republican Party Arizona state senators
County supervisors in Arizona
Women state legislators in Arizona
State treasurers of Arizona
Women state constitutional officers of Arizona
People from Chaffee County, Colorado
21st-century American women